The following fictional characters are unofficial helpers to the spy and crime-fighter Colonel Faridi in the Jasoosi Dunya (The Spy World) series of Urdu spy novels by Ibn-e-Safi.

Anwar
Anwar fleetingly delivers an opening in "Maut ki Aandhee" (The Hurricane of Death – #12).  He is an intelligent crime reporter, ex-lawyer, who respects only Faridi in law enforcement agencies.  During a discussion in the above book, Faridi tries to explain to Hameed why Anwar is so bitter about life.  Due to his harsh past life, Anwar changed into an angry, ruthless, but brave individual. He has a philosophy on life and he calls it "Revenge". To him, revenge is the driving force behind life.

Like Faridi, Imran, and Hameed, Anwar has also been bitten by love. Sajida was once involved with him but decided to leave Anwar for a businessman. Since then, Anwar desolated himself from the opposite sex and had been living in solitary. Sajida and her husband show up in "Heeray ki Kaan" (The Diamond Mine – #13) – the first book entirely on Anwar and Rasheeda's escapade.

Anwars's character is another example of Ibn-e-Safi's creativity and innovation for crafting personalities.  Anwar's character is developed such that the reader wants to love and hate him at the same time.  He is a black mailer but only for evildoers.  He insults Rasheeda on her idea of falling into love with her but loves her as a close friend.  He can be an accomplice to a criminal on rare occasions but can also shoot them for committing crimes against humanity. He is a good guy acting like a bad one.

After "Maut ki Aandhee", when Faridi and Hameed took a long vacation after solving the case of Vilman's Mechanical Windstorm, Ibn-e-Safi wrote four books based solely on Anwar and Rasheeda's adventures.  These four novels include "Heeray ki Kaan" (The Diamond Mine – #13), "Tijori ka Geet" (The Song of the Safe – #14), "Aatishi Parinda" (The Flaming Bird – #15), and "Khooni Patthar" (The Killing Stone – 16).  By the time of "Khooni Patthar", public demanded that Faridi and Hameed be brought back from their vacation.  Ibn-e-Safi respected that demand and conjoined the talents of Anwar and Rasheeda with that of Faridi and Hameed in "Bhayanak Jazeera" (The Frightful Island – #17) that is actually a story on Rasheeda's background.

Anwar is a crime reporter in "The Daily Star". He belongs to a very respectable rich family but, due to some differences of opinion, he lives alone. Anwar is a genius, and works as a private investigator. He plays it smart and keeps himself away from the police. Inspector Asif, a crooked police officer, is always asking for his help. However, as Anwar knows a lot about Asif's illegal tactics, he blackmails the inspector just to get free dinners or cover other expenses. In spite of his own intelligence, he respects Faridi and considers him as his Guru. Faridi obtains unofficial help from Anwar and Rasheeda in many cases.

Rasheeda
Rasheeda, lives in apartment next to Anwar's, and is his colleague and a close friend. Anwar is always in debt with Rasheeda because of his heavy spending, especially on cigarettes, books, and dining out. They are in a love-hate relationship. Rasheeda is a courageous young woman who can fight bravely against the criminals. Her character is portrayed in a very mysterious manner, until her actual identity is revealed in "Bhayanak Jazeera" (The Terrifying Island #17). Readers discover that she is the crown princess of a secret place called "Barren Island", raised outside her state because of the risk to her life from opponents. However, for the sake of Anwar, she does not accept the crown. Withdrawing herself in favour of another girl, she returns.

Neelam
Neelam's character is introduced in "Toofaan Ka Aghwaa" (The Abduction of a Storm – #67). Her father, a smuggler, was killed by one of his fellow gangsters. The same murderer also killed her mother when Neelam was only one year old. She often imagines herself in that rainy night when she was crying beside her mother's dead body on a street. She has a strong urge to get revenge for her parents' killing, which she eventually achieves. She has been raised by the leader of the smuggler's gang. In spite of living with criminals, she keeps herself away from crime and wants to get rid of their circle. When Faridi and Hameed searched for the smugglers, she finally got her chance, helping them break up the gang. Faridi then adopted her as a child. She usually calls Faridi 'Uncle' and Hameed 'Baba' (father). Initially, she assisted Faridi in "Rifle Ka Naghmaa" (The Song of the Rifle – #68), but is then sent abroad for higher studies in Criminology. She returns in "Neelam Ki Waapsi" (The Return of Neelam – #118).

Qasim
Qasim's character is the comic spirit of the Jasoosi Dunya Series. Whereas Hameed's sense of humour is more mature, Qasim's is the opposite: in other words, simplistic, childish, and spontaneous. Readers love and hate Qasim at the same time. On the one hand, Qasim deserves sympathy because he never had the freedom he needed as an adult and had a suppressed life before and after marriage. It is probably his suppressed upbringing that causes his speech irregularities. Qasim frequently switches some Urdu alphabets while speaking. On the other hand, he seems to be cheating on his wife and appears to be extremely unintelligent on occasion. But it is these mixed characteristics and the spontaneity of his character that provide an extreme comic relief in Jasoosi Dunya.

Qasim is the only son of Khan Bahadur Asim, an industrialist and owner of Asim Textiles. Qasim is first introduced in Burf Kay Bhoot (Snow Ghosts – #33). However, Hameed meets Qasim for the first time in "Zahreela Aadmi" (The Venomous Man – #87) which is Faridi's early days' story. Qasim is moving a motor-cycle rider along with his motor-cycle from one place to another. (Qasim's rider had accidentally hit Qasim.) Hameed found Qasim very entertaining, and since the time they met they never separated.

Qasim also comes up with these weird names for women. Since he is a huge man (seven feet tall and very fat), he likes healthy women and calls them full-falooties. Skinny, lightweight, and slim females on the other hand makes him very upset and hence deserve to be called "Yalayilee" in his opinion. This may have something to do with the fact that Qasim has never been able to develop a sexual relationship with his wife who belongs in the "Yalayilee" category.  He detestfully calls her "Gilahri Begum" (Mrs. Squirrel) because of her petite figure.

Qasim's hunger is unimaginable. He can finish several goat-legs and whole chickens without a single burp. In short, Qasim's appearance is more like that of a genie of Aladdin's lamp.

Tariq
Tariq is another interesting character created by Ibn-e-Safi. Tariq is an Arab by race but can speak several languages fluently.  He is a wanderer. No one knows his sources of income and yet, Tariq never seem to have any monetary issues.  Some think that Tariq is in search of old treasures.

Tariq first appears in "Purasraar Kunwaan" (The Mysterious Well – #6) as Nawab Rasheed-uz-Zaman's close friend. His mysterious personality makes him a suspicious individual. But he comes clean at the end of the story. He is an expert hypnotist and has a brilliant shine in his eyes.  Tariq carries a big, almost cat-sized mongoose that is considered a sacred animal in some South American tribes and called "Shaki" or "Shakaki".

His actual talent is revealed in "Khooni Bagolay" (Bloody Fireballs – # 45) and "Zameen Ke Badal"(Clouds of the Earth – #75) where Tariq's linguistic as well as hypnotic abilities benefited Faridi to travel through some primeval, barbaric tribes and catch criminals.

See also

 Ibn-e-Safi
 Jasoosi Dunya
 Ahmad Kamal Faridi
 Sajid Hameed
 Villains of Jasoosi Dunya
 List of Jasoosi Dunya by Ibn-e-Safi

Ibn-e-Safi
Jasoosi Dunya